Count István Bethlen de Bethlen (8 October 1874, Gernyeszeg – 5 October 1946, Moscow) was a Hungarian aristocrat and statesman and served as prime minister from 1921 to 1931.

Early life

The scion of an old Bethlen de Bethlen noble family from Transylvania, he was the only son of Count Istvan Bethlen de Bethlen (1831–1881) and Countess Ilona Teleki de Szék (1849–1914). He had two elder sisters: Countess Klementine Mikes de Zabola (1871–1954) and Countess Ilona Haller de Hallerkeö (1872–1924).

Career

Bethlen was elected to the Hungarian parliament as a Liberal in 1901. Later, he served as a representative of the new Hungarian government at the Paris Peace Conference in 1919. In that year, the weak centrist Hungarian government collapsed, and was soon replaced by a communist Hungarian Soviet Republic, under the leadership of Béla Kun.  Bethlen quickly returned to Hungary to assume leadership of the anti-communist "white" government based in Szeged, along with former Austro-Hungarian Navy admiral Miklós Horthy. After the "white" forces seized control of Hungary, Horthy was appointed Regent of Hungary.  Bethlen again took a seat in the Hungarian parliament, allying with the conservative factions there.

In 1919, Bethlen rejected a personal union between Romania and Hungary under the King of Romania.

After the attempted return of King Charles IV to the throne of Hungary in 1921, Horthy asked Bethlen to form a strong government to eliminate the possibility of other such threats to the new country. Bethlen founded the Party of National Unity. He was also able to unite the two most powerful factors in Hungarian society, the wealthy, primarily Jewish industrialists in Budapest and the old Magyar gentry in rural Hungary, into a lasting coalition; this effectively checked the rise of Fascism in the country for at least a decade. Bethlen was also able to reach an accord with the labor unions, earning their support for the government and eliminating a source of domestic dissent.

During the May 1926 trial of the Franc affair plotters Bethlen was called to testify over his involvement in it. French Prime Minister Aristide Briand utilized the scandal by pushing for Bethlen's removal from power and his replacement by a more liberal politician.  The plot centered around the efforts of Hungarian nationalists to damage the French economy by disseminating forged 1,000 French franc banknotes. Several plotters provided incriminating evidence of Bethlen's involvement, however Bethlen managed to cover up his role by exercising direct control over the proceedings.
Facing considerable public pressure Bethlen offered his resignation to Horthy, who refused to accept it. Bethlen subsequently shuffled his cabinet by replacing Interior Minister Iván Rakovszky. The outcome of the trials in fact increased Bethlen's popularity in Hungary.

During his decade in office, Bethlen led Hungary into the League of Nations and arranged a close alliance with Fascist Italy, even entering into a Treaty of Friendship with Italy in 1927, in order to further the nation's revisionist hopes. He was, however, defeated in his attempts to change the Treaty of Trianon, which stripped Hungary of most of its territory after the First World War. The Great Depression shifted Hungarian politics to the extreme right, and Horthy replaced Bethlen with Count Gyula Károlyi de Nagykároly, followed quickly by Gyula Gömbös de Jákfa, a noted fascist and antisemite.

Increasingly shunted into political obscurity, Bethlen stood out as one of the few voices in Hungary actively opposed to an alliance with Nazi Germany. As it became apparent that Germany was going to lose the Second World War, Bethlen attempted, unsuccessfully, to negotiate a separate peace with the Allied powers. By the spring of 1945 most of Hungary had fallen to the advancing Soviet troops. The communists, who returned with the Soviets, immediately began their scheme to take over the country. They saw the aging Bethlen as a threat, a man who could unite the political forces against them. For this they had him arrested by the Soviets in March 1945. Soon after, Bethlen was taken to Moscow, where he died in prison on 5 October 1946.

Personal life

On 27 Jun 1901, he married his distant cousin, the author Countess Margarete Bethlen de Bethlen (1882–1970). They had 3 sons:

 Count András Bethlen de Bethlen (1902–1970) ⚭ Magda Viola (b.1901) ⚭ Eszter Mészáros (1892–1955) ⚭ Maria Palma 'Mizzi' Hoffmann (b.1906); no issue
 Count István Bethlen de Bethlen (1904–1982) ⚭ Donna Maria Isabella dei Conti Parravicini (1912–2008); had issue
 Count Gábor Bethlen de Bethlen (1906–1981) ⚭ Edith Schmidt (1909–1969); had issue

Notes

References

 
 Ignác Romsics: István Bethlen: A Great Conservative Statesman of Hungary, 1874–1946. East European Monographs. Columbia University Press, 1995.
 
 
 
 Bethlen Istvan Emlekirata, 1944, Published in Hungarian/Magyar by Zrinyi Katonai Koenyvkiado, 1988.
 Record of Margarete Bethlen de Bethlen's death certificate from the Magyar Főnemességi Adattár (Hungarian Database of the Aristocracy)

External links

 

1874 births
1946 deaths
Counts of Hungary
Hungarian nobility
People from Mureș County
People from the Kingdom of Hungary
Hungarian Calvinist and Reformed Christians
Hungarian anti-communists
Counter-revolutionaries
Hungarian people of the Hungarian–Romanian War
Istvan
Prime Ministers of Hungary
Foreign ministers of Hungary
Finance ministers of Hungary
Justice ministers of Hungary
Agriculture ministers of Hungary
Members of the Hungarian Academy of Sciences
Burials at Kerepesi Cemetery
Heads of government who were later imprisoned
Unity Party (Hungary) politicians